Clogwyn Du'r Arddu (translates as the "black cliff of the black height"), or "Cloggy", is a north-facing rhyolite set of cliffs located on the northern flank of Snowdon mountain. Cloggy is considered to be one of the best traditional climbing areas in Britain, and has been called "The shrine of British climbing", and a "crucible for the development of most of the finest climbers in Britain and the scene of many of their finest achievements".

Structure
Cloggy is a north-facing mountain crag that requires a long walk-in from Llanberis. The cliff is broken into several large buttresses, most notably: East Buttress, The Pinnacle (lies above the East Buttress), West Buttress, and Far West Buttress.  The cliff's circa  in height and mountain elevation, combined with the steepness and quality of rock, gives it the feel of a face on an alpine mountain.

Climbing history
The first recorded climb was the 1798 ascent of the Eastern Terrace by Peter Bailey Williams and William Bingley, both botanists looking for alpine plants. However, it was not until the 1920s, that British rock climbers began to scale the main buttresses, starting with the East Buttress in 1927 (Fred Pigott with Pigott's Climb, 4 pitches 83-metres at HVS 5a), and the West Buttress in 1928 (Jack Longland, with Longland's Climb, 5 pitches 126-metres at VS 4c).

Since these early ascents, the cliff came to attract leading British rock climbers of every era including: Colin Kirkus (Great Slab 1930, and Chimney Route 1931 with J. Edwards, Curving Crack 1932), Joe Brown (The Boulder 1951, Llithrig 1952, The Corner 1952, Shrike 1952, November 1957), Don Whillans (Vember 1951, with J. Brown), and John Menlove Edwards (Chimney Route 1931 with C. Kirkus, and Bow Slab 1941).

During the mid-1980s, it became the focus of the leading British rock climbers of the day, particularly Jerry Moffatt (who freed Master's Wall in 1983), John Redhead (who freed Margins of the Mind in  1984), who were striving to free up the main face of the Great Wall (or Master's Wall), in the middle of the East Buttress. In 1986, Johnny Dawes eventually freed the route and called it Indian Face, which at a grade of E9 6c, was considered one of the most dangerous and difficult traditional rock climbs in the world.

While the cliff contains routes of all difficulties, few other crags in Britain contain such a concentration of routes above the extreme E7-grade.

Filmography
 Documentary:

Bibliography
North Wales Classics (Jack Geldard), 2010, Rockfax. .
North Wales Climbs (Mark Reeves, Jack Geldard, Mark Glaister), 2013, Rockfax. .
The Black Cliff: The history of rock climbing on Clogwyn du'r Arddu (Peter Crew, Jack Soper, Ken Wilson), 1971, Kaye & Ward .

See also

Clogwyn railway station
Dinas Cromlech, a mountain crag at Llanberis pass
Dinorwic quarry, a slate climbing area near Llanberis
History of rock climbing

References

Further reading

External links
Clogwyn Du'r Arddu (Cloggy), UKClimbing Crag Guide (2022)
Clogwyn Du'r Arddu (Cloggy), PlanetMountain Crag Guide (2022)

Betws Garmon
Llanberis
Cliffs of Gwynedd
Cliffs of Snowdonia
Rock formations of Gwynedd
Rock formations of Snowdonia
Climbing areas of Wales